This is a list of airports in Niger, sorted by location.



Airports 

Airport names shown in bold indicate the airport has scheduled service on commercial airlines.

See also 
 Transport in Niger
 List of airports by ICAO code: D#DR - Niger
 Wikipedia: WikiProject Aviation/Airline destination lists: Africa#Niger

References 
 
  - includes IATA codes
 Great Circle Mapper: Airports in Niger - IATA and ICAO codes
 World Aero Data: Airports in Niger - ICAO codes
 Aircraft Charter World: Airports in Niger

Niger
 
Airports
Airports
Niger